Saug-a-Gaw-Sing 1 is a First Nations reserve on Lake of the Woods in northwestern Ontario. It is the main reserve of the Anishnaabeg of Naongashiing.

References

External links
 Aboriginal Affairs and Northern Development Canada profile

Anishinaabe reserves in Ontario
Communities in Rainy River District